Lee Jung-soo (born 8 January 1980) is a South Korean former professional footballer who played as a centre-back.

Club career

Career in South Korea
After graduating from Kyung Hee University in 2002, Lee started his professional career at a K League club Anyang LG Cheetahs. (renamed FC Seoul since 2004) He was originally a forward, but Anyang's manager Cho Kwang-rae advised him to change his role to a defender. He played for Anyang LG Cheetahs/FC Seoul, Incheon United, and Suwon Samsung Bluewings as a defender in the K League, and won a league title with Suwon in 2008.

Career in Japan
In 2009, Lee joined J1 League side Kyoto Sanga FC. He scored five goals in the 2009 season, showing his scoring ability. Lee also participated in the Jomo Cup, contested between K League and J.League all-star team, and was named the MVP of the game. Lee joined another J1 League club Kashima Antlers the next year, playing for it for half a year. He transferred to a Qatari club Al-Sadd after the 2010 FIFA World Cup.

Al-Sadd
In the 2011 AFC Champions League semi-final first leg against his former club Suwon, Lee was involved in a heated argument with Al-Sadd teammates following Mamadou Niang's controversial second goal, which was scored after Suwon claimed to have put the ball out to allow treatment to injured players, thus inferring possession should have been returned to the Korean club. Lee said that the goal was "unfair" and suggested Al-Sadd should give a goal back although the idea was rejected. The situation prompted Lee to walk off the pitch requiring his manager Jorge Fossati to substitute him with Ibrahim Majid for the remainder of additional time.

Al-Sadd won the AFC Champions League final against Jeonbuk Hyundai Motors on penalties. Lee was chosen to take a penalty but his shot hit the crossbar, making him the only Al-Sadd player to miss in the penalty shootout.

In June 2012, a Chinese club Guangzhou Evergrande confirmed their interest in signing Lee and, according to the Jinghua Times, claimed that they signed him following his contract rejection from Al-Sadd. However, Lee rejected the Guangzhou's offer and signed a one-year extension with Al-Sadd.

Retirement
In the 2015–16 season, Lee suffered hand and calf injury, and Al-Sadd showed a poor defence due to his absence. His team needed a new centre-back to replace him, and offered him a job as a coach instead. However, he wanted to continue his playing career, courteously declining it. After leaving Al-Sadd in January 2016, he rejoined Suwon the next month, and announced his retirement the next year.

In February 2018, Lee joined Charlotte Independence of the United Soccer League unexpectedly. He started his coaching career after playing for Charlotte for a while.

International career
Lee was one of South Korea's major contributors when his country reached the knockout stage in the 2010 FIFA World Cup. He largely helped South Korea's attack by scoring two set-piece goals in the group stage.

Career statistics

Club

International

Results list South Korea's goal tally first.

Honours
Suwon Samsung Bluewings
K League 1: 2008
Korean FA Cup: 2016
Korean League Cup: 2008

Kashima Antlers
Japanese Super Cup: 2010

Al-Sadd
Qatar Stars League: 2012–13
Emir of Qatar Cup: 2014, 2015
Qatari Stars Cup: 2010
Qatar Cup runner-up: 2012, 2013
Sheikh Jassim Cup: 2014
AFC Champions League: 2011

South Korea U20
AFC Youth Championship: 1998

South Korea B
East Asian Games silver medal: 2001

South Korea
AFC Asian Cup third place: 2011
EAFF Championship runner-up: 2010

Individual
J.League All-Star Soccer Most Valuable Player: 2009

References

External links

 
 Lee Jung-soo – National Team stats at KFA 
 
 

 Kyoto Sanga F.C. Profile 

1980 births
Living people
Association football defenders
South Korean footballers
South Korean expatriate footballers
South Korea international footballers
2010 FIFA World Cup players
2011 AFC Asian Cup players
FC Seoul players
Incheon United FC players
Suwon Samsung Bluewings players
Kyoto Sanga FC players
Kashima Antlers players
Al Sadd SC players
K League 1 players
J1 League players
Qatar Stars League players
Expatriate footballers in Japan
Expatriate footballers in Qatar
South Korean expatriate sportspeople in Japan
South Korean expatriate sportspeople in Qatar
Sportspeople from South Gyeongsang Province
Kyung Hee University alumni
Charlotte Independence players
USL Championship players